Esteban Gabriel Orfano (born 13 January 1992) is an Argentine professional footballer who plays as a right midfielder.

Club career
Orfano started his career with Boca Juniors, notably featuring for their youth team at the 2011 U-20 Copa Libertadores in Peru; netting once across six matches. He was promoted into their senior squad during the 2010–11 Primera División, making two appearances against All Boys and Lanús under manager Julio César Falcioni. In January 2012, Orfano completed a loan move to Spain's Villarreal B. His debut arrived in a 0–3 defeat to Alcorcón in February, before featuring versus Alcoyano in a campaign which culminated with relegation from the Segunda División.

July 2013 saw Orfano loaned to Douglas Haig. After scoring his first two senior goals for Douglas Haig across 2013–14 in Primera B Nacional, Orfano joined fellow second tier team Patronato in July 2014. He remained for two seasons as they secured eighth and second place finishes, with the latter securing promotion to the Primera División. Orfano departed Patronato soon after, but stayed in the top-flight by agreeing a loan contract with Atlético de Rafaela. One goal in eleven followed. On 18 July 2016, Orfano left Boca permanently for Instituto. He participated thirty-six times and scored six in 2016–17.

Further stints in the ranks of Aldosivi, where he won promotion, and Nueva Chicago occurred between 2017 and 2018. His first goal for Nueva Chicago came on 28 September 2018 in an encounter with ex-club Atlético de Rafaela. Orfano scored a total of three times for them in 2018–19 as they reached the promotion play-offs. In July 2019, Orfano headed off to Bolivia with Wilstermann. He'd remain for a season and a half, netting goals against Real Potosí, Oriente Petrolero, Royal Pari and Aurora - all on home soil. He also featured eight times in the Copa Libertadores. He was released at the end of 2020.

International career
Orfano represented Argentina at U17 level. He won four caps at the 2009 FIFA World Cup in Nigeria, scoring against the hosts on the way to leaving the competition at the round of sixteen stage. At the beginning of that year, Orfano was selected as part of their squad for the South American U-17 Championship and made five appearances. He had previous experience with the U15s.

Career statistics
.

Honours
Aldosivi
Primera B Nacional: 2017–18

References

External links

1992 births
Living people
People from La Matanza Partido
Argentine footballers
Argentina youth international footballers
Association football midfielders
Argentine expatriate footballers
Expatriate footballers in Spain
Expatriate footballers in Bolivia
Argentine expatriate sportspeople in Spain
Argentine expatriate sportspeople in Bolivia
Argentine Primera División players
Segunda División players
Primera Nacional players
Bolivian Primera División players
Boca Juniors footballers
Villarreal CF B players
Club Atlético Douglas Haig players
Club Atlético Patronato footballers
Atlético de Rafaela footballers
Instituto footballers
Aldosivi footballers
Nueva Chicago footballers
C.D. Jorge Wilstermann players
Sportspeople from Buenos Aires Province